Runaway Slave is the debut studio album by American hip hop duo Showbiz and A.G. It was released on September 22, 1992 via Payday/London Records. Production was primarily handled by Showbiz, with the help from fellow D.I.T.C. crew member Diamond D on a couple of tracks. It features guest appearances from, DeShawn, Diamond D, Dres, Lord Finesse, and an early appearance of Big L. It also includes many interludes between songs that features The Legion, Freddie Foxxx, Fat Joe and Kid Capri.

The album was supported by Soul Clap EP, and spawned two singles: "Fat Pockets" and "Bounce Ta This".

Track listing

Vinyl release

Personnel
Andre "A.G." Barnes – vocals (tracks: 2-15)
Rodney "Showbiz" Lemay – vocals (tracks: 1, 2, 5, 6, 9, 12, 13, 15), producer
Joseph "Diamond D" Kirkland – vocals (track 1), co-producer (tracks: 8, 14)
Andre "Dres" Titus – vocals (track 3)
Robert "Lord Finesse" Hall, Jr. – vocals (track 11)
Lamont "Big L" Coleman – vocals (track 11)
DeShawn "Sunkiss" Barzey – vocals (track 11)
Richard "Dick" Scott March – management

Chart positions
Album

Singles

References

External links

1992 debut albums
London Records albums
Showbiz and A.G. albums
Albums produced by Diamond D
Albums produced by Showbiz (producer)